Love as Laughter was an American indie rock band from Olympia, Washington. The band was formed in 1994 by vocalist and guitarist Sam Jayne as a solo project following the break-up of his previous band, Lync. In 2008, the band signed with Isaac Brock's label Glacial Pace and released the album Holy. At the time, the band featured Jayne, Ivan Berko on bass, Zeke Howard on drums, Andy Macleod on guitar and Robbie Lee on keyboards. Jayne was found dead on December 15, 2020, at the age of 46.

Sam Jayne's Death
Sam Jayne was found unresponsive lying in the back of his car by New York City Police Department about a week after he was reported missing. He was pronounced dead at the scene. Preliminary research from NYPD showed no “signs of criminality.” His family confirmed that his cause of death was a result of heart-related, “undiagnosed health conditions,” and that he died peacefully while curled up in his car the night before a planned cross-country drive to visit friends around the holidays.

Discography

Studio albums
 The Greks Bring Gifts (1996)
 #1 USA (1997)
 Destination 2000 (1999)
 Sea to Shining Sea (2001)
 Laughter's Fifth (2005)
 Holy (2008)

EPs
 Trademark of Quality (2007)
 Holy E.P. (2008)
 Greks II: Slight Return (2013)

Singles
 Love As Laughter / Ringfinger - Love As Laughter and Ringfinger (1995)
 Do You Experience Alien Boredom? (1995)
 Love As Laughter / The Seductive - Tour Split (1996)
 I'm A Bee (1996)
 Planet Of Children (1996)
 Fever (1996)
 Nude 'Hos (1998)
 My Case (2000)
 Looks Like This City's Broken (2000)
 Temptation Island (2001)
 Timers (2010)
  Lazy Soldier B/W Oasis (2015)

Sam Jayne solo
 The "Natural" Sessions
 The Super Natural Sessions

References

External links
 

Indie rock musical groups from Washington (state)
K Records artists
Musical groups established in 1994
Musical groups disestablished in 2020
Musical groups from Olympia, Washington
Sub Pop artists
1994 establishments in Washington (state)
2020 disestablishments in Washington (state)